Abu Ubaid al-Qasim ibn Sallam al-Khurasani al-Harawi (c. 770–838) was an Arab philologist and the author of many standard books on lexicography, Qur’anic sciences, hadith, and fiqh.

He was born in Herat, the son of a Byzantine slave. He left his native town and studied philology at the Basra school under many famous scholars such as al-Asmaʿi (d. 213/828), Abu ʿUbayda (d. c.210/825), and Abu Zayd al-Ansari (d. 214 or 215/830–1), and at the Kufa school under Abu ʿAmr al-Shaybani (d. c.210/825), al-Kisaʾi (d. c.189/805), and others.

He was the first to develop a recorded science for tajwid, giving the rules of tajwid names and putting it into writing in his book called al-Qirā'āt. He wrote about 25 reciters, including the 7 mutawatir reciters. He made the reality, transmitted through reciters of every generation, a science with defined rules, terms, and enunciation. He wrote extensively on the originally revealed, but now missing and lost, verses from the Qur’an.

Selected works
Kitab al-Amwal (The Book of Revenue)
Kitab Al-Nāsikh wa-l-mansūkh (The Book of Abrogation)
Kitab Fada’il-al-Qur’an (The Excellent Qualities of the Holy Quran)

References

770s births
838 deaths
9th-century people from the Abbasid Caliphate
9th-century Muslim scholars of Islam
Shafi'is
People from Herat
Arab Sunni Muslim scholars of Islam
Quranic exegesis scholars
Hadith scholars
Arab people of Greek descent